Grease 2: Original Soundtrack Recording is the original motion picture soundtrack for the 1982 film Grease 2 starring Maxwell Caulfield and Michelle Pfeiffer. It was originally released by RSO Records in 1982, with Polydor Records re-issuing it in 1996.

Like the film, the soundtrack failed to match the commercial success of its predecessor. The album peaked at #71 on the Billboard album chart. The lead single, "Back to School Again" by the Four Tops, peaked at #71 on the Billboard Hot 100 in the U.S. and at #62 on the UK Singles Chart.

Reception
Billboard magazine listed the album among its "Top Album Picks", meaning that the album was predicted to reach the top half of the album chart. Comparing the soundtrack to that of the first film, the Billboard reviewer wrote, "The soundtrack is a similar mix of peppy party tunes ('Who's That Guy' recalls 'Summer Nights') and pretty ballads ('We'll Be Together' has some of the AC appeal of 'Hopelessly Devoted to You')." However, the reviewer also commented, "Don't hold your breath waiting for 'Grease 3.'"

Track listing

Charts

Personnel
Tim May: Guitars
Andy Muson: Bass
Denny Seiwell: Drums
Louis St. Louis: Keyboards
Michael Gibson: Orchestrations

Certifications

References

Musical film soundtracks
1982 soundtrack albums
RSO Records soundtracks
Polydor Records soundtracks
Grease (musical)